Mu'in al-Din or Moinuddin is a male Muslim name composed of the elements Muin, meaning helper and ad-Din, meaning of the faith. It may refer to:

Mu'in ad-Din Unur (d. 1149), Seljuk ruler of Damascus
Mu'in al-Din Chishti (1143–1236), Sufi saint
Mu'in al-Din Hasan ibn al-Shaykh (d. 1246), vizier of the Ayyubid sultanate
Pervâne Mu'in al-Din Suleyman (d. 1277), politician in Anatolia
Mo'in al-Din Junayd ibn Mahmud ibn Muhammad Baghnovi Shirazi, or just Junayd Shirazi (fl. 1389), Persian Sufi poet
Muhammad Mueenuddeen I (d. 1835), sultan of the Maldives
Muhammad Mueenuddeen II (fl. 1887), sultan of the Maldives
Moinuddin Haider (b. 1942), Pakistan army General
Moinuddin Aqeel (b. 1946), Pakistani author, critic and linguist
Mirza Ghulam Moinuddin Muhammad, Javaid Jah Bahadur (b. 1946), Indian descendant of the Mughal emperors
, Baluchi-Iranian Politician
Moinuddin (cricketer) (b. 1987), Pakistani cricketer

References

Arabic masculine given names
Islamic honorifics
Arabic words and phrases